Noicattaro (known as Noja until 1862)  is a town and comune in the Metropolitan City of Bari and region of Apulia, southern Italy.

The Mother Church (Chiesa Madre) dates to the 12th–13th centuries and is built in Apulian-Romanesque style. The town is also home to several Baroque churches, such as the Chiesa del Carmine and Madonna della Lama.

Sport

Baseball/Softball
Baseball Club Bari - Warriors, Since 1971, the historic baseball and softball company has played in the different national baseball championships to the "B" series, for softball up to the "A2"

Currently the company is engaged in youth activities at schools and in the national baseball championship series "C" . A.P.D. Baseball Club Bari Warriors.

References

Cities and towns in Apulia